Billings is the largest city in the U.S. state of Montana.

Billings may also refer to:

Places

United States
 Billings, Missouri
 Billings, New York
 Billings, Oklahoma
 Billings, West Virginia
 Billings County, Kansas
 Billings County, North Dakota
 Billings Field, a park located in West Roxbury, Massachusetts, U.S.
 Billings Township, Michigan

Elsewhere
Billings, Hesse, Germany
Billings, Ontario, Canada
Billings, Russia
 73703 Billings, a minor planet
 Billings Bridge, a bridge over the Rideau River in Ottawa, Canada, named after Braddish Billings
 Billings Reservoir, a reservoir in São Paulo, Brazil
Billings Ward, former name of Southgate Ward
 Cape Billings, a headland on the northern coast of Chukotka, Russian Federation

People with the name
 Billings (surname)
 Billings Learned Hand (1872–1961), an American judge

Historic sites
 Billings estate (Manhattan) or Tyrone Hall, a 1903 mansion owned by American industrialist C. K. G. Billings
 Billings-Cole House, an historic house in Malvern, Arkansas, U.S.

Military
 Operation Billings, a search and destroy operation during the Vietnam War
 USS Billings (launched 2017), a 2017 U.S. Navy littoral combat ship

Other uses
 Billings, a business term for sales or revenue
 Billings and Edmonds, an English school uniform supplier
 Billings Computer Corporation, a defunct American computer manufacturer
 Billings ovulation method, a form of natural family planning
 Billings-Burns, English automobile built only in 1900
 Camp Billings, a summer camp in Vermont, U.S.
 Steve Billings, a fictional detective in The Shield

See also
 Billing (disambiguation)
 Billinge (disambiguation)
 Billings Refinery (disambiguation)
 Justice Billings (disambiguation)